Preferred metric sizes are a set of international standards and de facto standards that are designed to make using the metric system easier and simpler, especially in engineering and construction practices. One of the methods used to arrive at these preferred sizes is the use of preferred numbers and convenient numbers such as the Renard series, the 1-2-5 series to limit the number of different sizes of components needed.

One of the largest benefits of such limits is an ensuing multiplicative or exponential reduction in the number of parts, tools and other items needed to support the installation and maintenance of the items built using these techniques. This occurs because eliminating one diameter fastener will typically allow the elimination of a large number of variations on that diameter (multiple thread pitches, multiple lengths, multiple tip types, multiple head types, multiple drive types, and the tools needed for installing each, including multiple drill bits (one for each different thread pitch, material, and fit combination).

Food and beverages

Liquor bottle sizes 
International agreements, including 75/106/EEC, specify the capacities of liquor bottles allowed in international commerce as the following 10 sizes:
 100 ml ( L)
 250 ml ( L)
 375 ml ( L)
 500 ml ( L)
 750 ml ( L)
 1 L
 1.5 L
 2 L
 3 L
 5 L

In the United States, the alcohol industry switched to metric bottle sizes on October 1, 1976, abandoning the existing 38 sizes of bottles and instead adopting the following 6 sizes: 

 50 mL (miniature)
 200 mL (replaced the half-pint) (≈237 mL is a U.S. half-pint)
 500 mL (replaced the pint) (≈473 mL is a U.S. pint)
 750 mL (replaced the fifth) (≈757 mL is a U.S. fifth)
 1000 mL (replaced the quart) (≈946 mL is a U.S. quart)
 1750 mL (replaced the half-gallon) (≈1893 mL is a half U.S. gallon)

Building construction

System 32 furniture 

System 32 is a standard for the design and manufacture of furniture, most commonly used in the design of cabinets, wherein the major parts (sides, doors, etc.) are available in increments of 32 mm, and shelf supports consist of columns of 5 mm holes on 32 mm centers.

ISO 2848 basic module 

The ISO 2848 basic module is a unit of 100 mm, often represented by a single capital "M", along with 300 mm and 600 mm groupings, that is widely used for the widths of furniture in Europe.
 A standard metric (concrete) block is 190 mm wide, 390 mm long, and 190 mm high, which allows for 10 mm mortar joints in between bricks, giving a standard unit size of 200 mm square by 400 mm long.
 A standard metric brick is 90 by 57 by 190 mm; with 10 mm of mortar, that produces a standard unit of 100 mm x 200 mm.

Office equipment and supplies

ISO 216 paper sizes 

Also related is the set of pen thicknesses for technical drawings (0.13, 0.18, 0.25, 0.35, 0.50, 0.70, 1.00, 1.40, and 2.00 mm).

Manufacturing

ISO 261 and 262 fastener diameters 

ISO 261 defines a set of preferred metric machine screw/bolt sizes, and ISO 262 defines a subset of those; both are based roughly on Renard series as defined in ISO 3, ISO 17, and ISO 497. Given that even ISO 262 specifies a fairly large set of diameters, a much simplified set of preferred diameters was developed by one of the lead designers of ASME Z17.1 and ANSI B4.2, Knut O. Kverneland, to reduce the list to 6 preferred sizes, and another 6 intermediate supplementary sizes.

For each size bolt or screw and type of head, there is a corresponding size driver prescribed by various ISO standards, including:
 Internal hex drive: ISO 2936:2014 "Assembly tools for screws and nuts—Hexagon socket screw keys"
 External hex drive: ISO  4014, 4016, 4017, and 4018

For Torx bolts, there is a corresponding size driver prescribed by Acument, the designer of the Torx drive system. , there are no ISO standards for hexalobular drive sizes.

Similarly, for Torx Plus bolts, there is a corresponding size driver prescribed by Acument, the designer of the Torx Plus drive system. , there are no ISO standards for hexalobular drive sizes.

ISO 1307 plastic hose sizes 

See also:
 ISO 6708 Nominal Diameter (for garden hose sizes)

ISO 1307:2006, Rubber and plastics hoses—Hose sizes, minimum and maximum inside diameters, and tolerances on cut-to-length hoses specifies nominal diameters for four different types of plastic hoses, including "Type C", which includes the typical garden hose. Each nominal diameter specifies different ID minimum and maximum values. The nominal size is a Renard series.

ISO 6708 nominal pipe diameter 

Nominal diameter, abbreviated DN (diamètre nominal/Durchmesser nach Norm), is the designation system specified by ISO 6708 for specifying the diameter of trade sizes of metric pipework components, and is the metric equivalent to Nominal Pipe Size. It is among several ISO specifications that formalize preferred numbers, and is referred to by numerous other international standards, including ISO 7598 and EN 10255. The complete set of DN values allowed by the standard are:

The number following the DN is a nominal value that is roughly the number of millimeters of a circular feature on the connection point of the pipe, fitting, coupling, etc., but often differing by a noticeable amount. If the DN value is related to the internal bore diameter of the feature, the size should be represented by DN/ID (for Inside Diameter), and if the DN value is related to the outside diameter, the size should be represented by DN/OD (for Outside Diameter).

The relationship between DN and NPS pipe sizes are as follows. Note that the actual internal diameter varies depending on the pipe wall thickness.

See also 
 Eurocontainer, a system for boxes that can be used for reusable packaging for transport and storage
 Gastronorm, a standard for professional kitchenware tray and container sizes
 ISO metric screw thread, the international standard for machine screw threads

References 

Metric system